Anoplognathus rhinastus is a species of beetle in the family Scarabaeidae native to eastern Australia. It is about 24-25 mm in length.

References

Beetles described in 1850
Scarabaeidae
Beetles of Australia